is a Japanese light novel written by Tōru Honda and illustrated by Kasumu Kirino. It was adapted into a live action film in 2010.

Cast
 Maasa Sudo as Tsurugi Yabusame
 Hisanori Satō as Yakumo Atae
 Ayana Taketatsu as Yūna Ichigo
 Arisa Noto as Kokona Atae
 Mariko Kouda as Marumi Atae
 Hiroki Suzuki as Kiyomaro Ishikiri

See also

Travellers and Magicians

References

External links
Official website 

2008 Japanese novels
GA Bunko
Light novels
2010s Japanese films